The 1976 ABA Playoffs was the postseason tournament of the American Basketball Association's 1975–76 season. The tournament concluded with the New York Nets defeating the Denver Nuggets four games to two in the ABA Finals.

This was the final year of the ABA.  The ABA-NBA merger took place on June 17, 1976.  Thus the final game in ABA history was played on May 13, 1976, when the New York Nets defeated the Denver Nuggets 112-106 at Nassau Coliseum in Uniondale, New York.

As there were no divisions in the regular season, the playoffs involved five teams, with a first-round best-of-three series played between the fourth-place Kentucky Colonels and fifth-place Indiana Pacers; Kentucky won the series, 2 games to 1.

Notable events 

Julius Erving of the New York Nets was the Most Valuable Player of the ABA playoffs.  He won that distinction previously in 1974 and became the only player in ABA history to repeat as the MVP of the league playoffs.

On April 28, 1976, the Kentucky Colonels lost the seventh game of their series with the Denver Nuggets.  The loss marked the final game for the Colonels and the final game for any ABA team that did not proceed into the NBA with the ABA-NBA merger.

The Nuggets and the Nets met in the championship series after posting the two best regular season records in the league.

With their 4-3 loss in their opening round matchup with the New York Nets, the San Antonio Spurs concluded their ABA tenure without ever winning a single ABA playoff series. Since joining the NBA, the Spurs have won 5 NBA championships total, making them the only ABA team that has won a championship in the NBA.

Score

Quarterfinals

(1) Denver Nuggets, (2) New York Nets, (3) San Antonio Spurs have division Quarterfinals byes.

(4) Kentucky Colonels vs. (5) Indiana Pacers:
Colonels win series 2-1
Game 1 @ Kentucky:  Kentucky 120, Indiana 109
Game 2 @ Indiana:  Indiana 109, Kentucky 95
Game 3 @ Kentucky:  Kentucky 100, Indiana 99

Semifinals

(1) Denver Nuggets vs. (4) Kentucky Colonels:
Nuggets win series 4-3
Game 1 @ Denver:  Denver 110, Kentucky 107
Game 2 @ Denver:  Kentucky 138, Denver 110
Game 3 @ Kentucky:  Kentucky 126, Denver 114
Game 4 @ Kentucky:  Denver 108, Kentucky 106
Game 5 @ Denver:  Denver 127, Kentucky 117
Game 6 @ Kentucky:  Kentucky 119, Denver 115
Game 7 @ Denver:  Denver 133, Kentucky 110

(2) New York Nets vs. (3) San Antonio Spurs:
Nets win series 4-3
Game 1 @ New York:  New York 116, San Antonio 101
Game 2 @ New York:  San Antonio 105, New York 79
Game 3 @ San Antonio:  San Antonio 111, New York 103
Game 4 @ San Antonio:  New York 110, San Antonio 108
Game 5 @ New York:  New York 110, San Antonio 108
Game 6 @ San Antonio:  San Antonio 115, New York 110
Game 7 @ New York:  New York 121, San Antonio 114

Finals

(1) Denver Nuggets vs. (2) New York Nets:
Nets win series 4-2
Game 1 (May  1) @ Denver:  New York 120, Denver 118
Game 2 (May  4) @ Denver:  Denver 127, New York 121
Game 3 (May  6) @ New York:  New York 117, Denver 111
Game 4 (May  8) @ New York:  New York 121, Denver 112
Game 5 (May 11) @ Denver:  Denver 118, New York 110
Game 6 (May 13) @ New York:  New York 112, Denver 106

External links
RememberTheABA.com page on 1976 ABA playoffs
Basketball-Reference.com's 1976 ABA Playoffs page
RememberTheABA.com page on 1976 ABA playoff series between the Kentucky Colonels and the Denver Nuggets

Playoffs
American Basketball Association playoffs